In Kiribati, there are no longer official administrative divisions but it is possible to divide Kiribati geographically into one isolated island and three archipelagos or island groups:

 Banaba – isolated island
 Gilbert Islands
 Line Islands
 Phoenix Islands

Kiribati was divided into six districts before gaining independence:

 Banaba
 Tarawa
 Northern Gilbert Islands
 Central Gilbert Island
 Southern Gilbert Islands
 Line Islands

Four of the former districts (including Tarawa) lie in the Gilbert Islands, where 90% of the country's population lives. Only three of the Line Islands are inhabited, while the Phoenix Islands are uninhabited apart from Canton Island (20 people) and had no official representation. Banaba itself is sparsely inhabited now (330 people in 2020). There is also a representative non-elected of the Banabans relocated since 1945 to Rabi Island in the country of Fiji.

Local councils 
There are 21 inhabited islands in Kiribati. Each inhabited island has its own council(s). Two atolls have more than one local council: Tarawa has three and Tabiteuea has two, for a total of 24 local councils.

John Hilary Smith as the Governor, created the three councils of Tarawa, in 1972.

Banaba

Banaba

Tarawa

Betio Town Council (BTC) of South Tarawa
Eutan Tarawa Council (ETC) of North Tarawa
Teinainano Urban Council (TUC) of South Tarawa

Northern Gilbert Islands

Abaiang
Butaritari
Makin
Marakei

Central Gilbert Islands

Abemama
Aranuka
Kuria
Maiana

Southern Gilbert Islands

Arorae
Beru
Nikunau
Nonouti
North Tabiteuea (Tabiteuea)
Onotoa
South Tabiteuea (Tabiteuea)
Tamana

Phoenix Islands

Canton

Line Islands

Kiritimati
Tabuaeran
Teraina

See also
 ISO 3166-2:KI
 List of islands of Kiribati

 
Kiribati geography-related lists
Kiribati, Districts
Kiribati 1